Gloria M. Segal (née Rodich) (April 11, 1928 – October 27, 1993) was an American politician and businesswoman.

Born in Minneapolis, Minnesota, Segal graduated from North High School, in Minneapolis, Minnesota. Segal graduated from University of Minneapolis and went to Metropolitan State University. She also went to Harvard Business School. Segal was involved with the investment business. Segal lived in St. Louis Park, Minnesota. Segal served in the Minnesota House of Representatives from 1983 until her resignation in 1992 because her treatment from brain cancer. Segal was a Democrat. Segal died at her home in St. Louis Park, Minnesota from a cancerous brain tumor.

Notes

1928 births
1993 deaths
Politicians from Minneapolis
People from St. Louis Park, Minnesota
Harvard Business School alumni
Metropolitan State University alumni
University of Minnesota alumni
Businesspeople from Minnesota
Women state legislators in Minnesota
Democratic Party members of the Minnesota House of Representatives
Deaths from cancer in Minnesota
Deaths from brain cancer in the United States
20th-century American women politicians
20th-century American politicians
20th-century American businesspeople